Sean Chen (born August 15, 1968, in Washington, D.C.) is an American comic book artist.

Career
Chen is a graduate of Carnegie Mellon University where he received a bachelor's degree in industrial design. He started his career after being discovered by Barry Windsor-Smith. He began his career at Valiant Comics, penciling their flagship title, X-O Manowar, as well as Bloodshot, Harbinger, and Rai and the Future Force. His debut book, RFF #9, sold over 900,000 copies.

After Valiant, he then moved on to Marvel Comics, where he drew Iron Man for over three years. His other works include Wolverine, Elektra, and the maxi-series X-Men: The End.

Chen also lends his talents to Marvel's Creative Services Division where he contributes to style guides and licensing art, including box cover illustrations for the Iron Man video game and various promotional items such as lunchboxes, T-shirts and posters.

Currently, Chen is the regular artist on the monthly Nova series from Marvel. Aside from comic books, he applies his creative talents by designing furniture and home renovations, specializing in kitchens and molded concrete countertops. He has also started a new line of designer toys and figurines.

External links

 

 The Blvd Studio
 Sean Chen on Marvel.com

American people of Taiwanese descent
Carnegie Mellon University College of Fine Arts alumni
Living people
1968 births